Himmelbjerget ("The Sky Mountain" or "The Mountain of Heaven") is a hill located between Ry and Silkeborg, Denmark in the area known as Søhøjlandet.

With a height of 147 m (482 ft), Himmelbjerget is one of the highest natural points in the Danish landscape. The hill and surrounding area has been a centre for various gatherings and celebrations for more than 200 years and in 1875, a red brick tower was erected at the top.

Height and prominence 
Himmelbjerget was believed to be the highest natural point in Denmark until 1847, when Ejer Bavnehøj was measured as the highest point. Following a scientific survey in 2005, Møllehøj was established as the highest natural point, at 170.86 m; Himmelbjerget is now ranked fourth-highest behind Møllehøj, Yding Skovhøj and Ejer Bavnehøj. An amusing detail is the sign "to the boat" at the peak.

Historic importance

Himmelbjerget grew to fame in Denmark during the 19th century, as people gathered here to admire the magnificent views and celebrate the birth of the Danish nation. On top of the hill is a 25.1 m tall tower, that was erected in 1875 to honour King Frederik VII and his role in giving the Danish people the country's first constitution in 1849, thereby ending the preceding era of absolute monarchy. Close to the top are more monuments, most honouring individuals, but also one to commemorate women's right to vote in 1915.

In those days, several steamboats began ferrying visitors back and forth to Himmelbjerget, from various destinations across Julsø and The Silkeborg Lakes. This tradition is still alive and the historic steamship Hjejlen ("The Golden Plover"), carries passengers here from the towns of Ry and Silkeborg.

Hiking
There are several hiking routes in the larger area of Søhøjlandet and the major route of Hiking Route Aarhus-Silkeborg, is passing through the area of Himmelbjerget. There are also plenty of opportunity to small scale hiking experiences on and around the hill itself.

See also
 Møllehøj
 List of hills and mountains in Denmark

References

Sources
 Himmelbjerget Tårnkomitéen (English: the tower committee). Official homepage in English.
 Himmelbjerget - not the tallest but the most beautiful The Nature Agency.

External links 

 The highest peaks of Denmark Danskebjerge.dk
 Himmelbjerget Tårnkomitéen.
 Hiking Route Aarhus-Silkeborg Århus Amt 
 Himmelbjerget, Sletten and Slåensø The Nature Agency. A pamphlet on hiking in the area. 

Skanderborg Municipality
Hills of Denmark